Slza is a Czech pop music band, composed of singer Petr Lexa and guitarist and founder Lukáš Bundil. The band emerged in 2014 with the song "Lhůta záruční". Other musicians play with them at concerts, but are not permanent members of the band.

Releases
The actress Veronika Hájková appeared in the video for their first song, "Lhůta záruční". The lyrics for this song were written by Ondřej Ládek, who performs as Xindl X, an occasional collaborator with the band. Barbora Zelená, the finalist of the Miss 2011 competition, appeared in the video for their second song "Celibát". Their third release was "Katarze", which became the theme tune for the television serial Přístav. In 2015 they released their debut album Katarze. The album sold 3,000 copies in its first week and entered the Czech charts at number one, and was certified platinum after three weeks. Their fourth single, released at the beginning of April 2016, was called "Fáze pád".

In autumn 2017 Slza released their second studio album Holomráz.

Nominations and awards

Discography

Albums

Singles

Music videos

References

External links 
 

 
Czech pop music groups
Musical groups established in 2013
2013 establishments in the Czech Republic
Universal Music Group artists